VTS can refer to:

Vanishing testes syndrome, another name for anorchia
Vanishing twin syndrome, a complication of multiple pregnancy
Vehicle Telematics System, remote control, monitoring, and navigation of road vehicles
Vehicle tracking system, equipment and programs for monitoring road vehicle locations
Vessel traffic service, maritime traffic control system for a port or harbor
Vertical Tabulation Set, character code 0x8A in the C0 and C1 control codes
Virginia Theological Seminary, an Episcopal seminary in Alexandria, Virginia
Video Title Set, a directory element on a DVD-Video disk
Virtual Tape Server, an IBM Virtual tape library system
VTS, an ICAO code for Everts Air